Keiferia colombiana is a moth in the family Gelechiidae. It was described by Povolný in 1975. It is found in Colombia.

References

Keiferia
Moths described in 1975
Taxa named by Dalibor Povolný